Liechtenstein competed at the 2012 European Athletics Championships held in Helsinki, Finland, between 27 June to 1 July 2012. 1 competitor, 1 man took part in 2 events.

Results

Men
Track events

References
 

2012
Nations at the 2012 European Athletics Championships
European Athletics Championships